Marius van Heerden (8 September 1974 – 22 January 2021) was a South African middle-distance runner. He competed in the men's 800 metres at the 1996 Summer Olympics. 

van Heerden died of COVID-19 during the pandemic in South Africa.

References

External links
 

1974 births
2021 deaths
Athletes (track and field) at the 1996 Summer Olympics
South African male middle-distance runners
Olympic athletes of South Africa
World Athletics Championships athletes for South Africa
People from Cederberg Local Municipality
Deaths from the COVID-19 pandemic in South Africa